Claude Colombo (born 1 October 1960 in Nice, France) was a French professional football referee. He refereed 2000 Coupe de France Final.

References 

1960 births
Living people
French football referees
French sportspeople of Italian descent